Emilee Jane Cherry  (born 2 November 1992) is a former Australian Rugby Union player. She represented Australia in Sevens Rugby and won a gold medal at the 2016 Summer Olympics in Rio.

Born in Roma, Queensland and playing for Toowoomba Bears at a club level, Cherry debuted for Australia in November 2012. As of December 2015, she had 14 caps. Cherry is a dual international, having represented Australia in Touch football (rugby league).

Cherry was the 2013/14 Women’s Sevens World Player of the Year, her game lifting after Tim Walsh took over as Head Coach in September 2013. She scored the most tries in the series (33), scored the most points (195) and was the stand-out player during the 2013–14 IRB World Series season as she was named the 2014 World Sevens Player of the Year. Representative honours include Touch Football Australia, Aussie Pearls and Queensland.

Cherry was a member of Australia's team at the 2016 Olympics, defeating New Zealand in the final to win the inaugural Olympic gold medal in the sport.

On 28 May 2021, she retired from rugby, citing injury and motherhood her reasons to retire.

References

External links
 
 
 Player profile at Australian Rugby

1992 births
Australian female rugby union players
Sportswomen from Queensland
Australian female rugby sevens players
Living people
Recipients of the Medal of the Order of Australia
Rugby sevens players at the 2016 Summer Olympics
Olympic rugby sevens players of Australia
Touch footballers
Olympic gold medalists for Australia
Olympic medalists in rugby sevens
Medalists at the 2016 Summer Olympics
Australia international rugby sevens players
Commonwealth Games medallists in rugby sevens
Commonwealth Games silver medallists for Australia
Rugby sevens players at the 2018 Commonwealth Games
Medallists at the 2018 Commonwealth Games